Cherry Creek is a tributary of the Cheyenne River, approximately 50 mi (80 km), in central South Dakota in the United States.

Cherry Creek was so named on account of the cherry trees along its course.

It rises in the prairie country of northern Meade County, and flows southeast and east, across the southwest corner of the Cheyenne River Sioux Indian Reservation, and past Red Scaffold. It joins the Cheyenne at the town of Cherry Creek.

See also
List of rivers of South Dakota

References

Rivers of South Dakota
Rivers of Meade County, South Dakota
Rivers of Ziebach County, South Dakota